The demographic history of Montenegro can be shown through census results and official documents which mention demographic composition.

Medieval 
Duklja, today's southern half of Montenegro, under Stefan Vojislav, was inhabited by Serbs.

Various documents listed that the inhabitants of Medieval Doclea or Zeta were Serbs, but also minor populations of Latins, Albanians and Vlachs. The language in usage was primarily the Old Slavonic, while in the early stages Latin also had importance and Greek to an extent among the high-class members of the society.

Between the 15th and 17th century, Montenegro had little history on paper. During these years, hundreds of families from Montenegro moved to Rascia which Serbs left to sought refuge in Habsburg Monarchy.

1614
Mariano Bolizza of Kotor was a public servant of the Republic of Venice. The main objective of his 1614 report and description of the Sanjak of Shkodra was to provide information on the land routes which could best be utilized by local couriers conveying official correspondence from Venice to Constantinople and back, and to survey the military potential of the territory. He provided a very detailed overview of towns and villages in Montenegro and northern Albania in the early 17th century. The report concluded a religious Orthodox majority, while an Albanian minority was present in the Shkodra region.

18th century
The ethnic composition in the 18th century was clear among the Slavs;

In a letter to Justinian Bert in 1756, Montenegrin chieftains said: "We are of the Orthodox Christian faith and law of the Eastern Church, of the honorable and glorious Slav-Serb kin".
Jovan Stefanov Balevic, of the Bratonožić clan, who later became a major in the Russian army, wrote "A brief and objective description of the present state of Montenegro" in St. Petersburg in 1757, where it said: "All inhabitants of Montenegro are ethnically Slav-Serbs and confessionally Greek-Orthodox . As they are incompetent in some skills, because of their lack of school, they are naturally capable, especially with weapons."; "The number of Montenegrin warriors who live free on the peaks of Montenegro, called by Turks disobedient, does not exceed 5000."; "There are no artisans and schools in Montenegro except at the Cetinje monastery, within the archbishop's residence, where priests learn reading and writing in the Slav-Serb language, which is financed by the archbishop."; "Montenegrins count among themselves neighbouring Slav-Serbs of different provenience: Kuči, Bratonožići, Donji and Gornji Vasojevići, Piperi, Rovčani, Moračani, Bjelopavlići, who are Serbian Orthodox but Ottoman citizens. They, also, count Roman Catholics: Hoti, Kelmendi, Gruda, Tuzi, Skrivali, Huzi, Maltezi, Kastrati and others who outnumber Montenegrins."
Metropolitan Sava called his people, the Montenegrins, by the "Serbian nation" (1766).
In June 1789, Montenegrin Chieftains, wrote to Russian Empress Katarina II, in the name of the entire Serb Montenegrin community: "We Serbs Montenegrins hope that we shall not be left without help" and "If we could have organization and munition, we would liberate our glorious Serb lands entirely from the Barbarian yoke (Ottoman Empire), together with our armed Serb brothers who aim to attack this enemy from all sides."

19th century
 According to the census conducted in 1863 and 1864, the Principality of Montenegro had a total of 196.230 inhabitants, 99.889 male and 96.339 female.
Bernard Schwartz estimated in 1882 that the Princedom of Montenegro had 160,000 inhabitants. Although, a more usual estimate is that it was around 230,000 inhabitants.

1900 

In 1900, according to international sources, the Principality of Montenegro had 311,564 inhabitants. By religion:
 293,527 Orthodox Christians (94.21%)
 12,493 Muslims (4.01%)
 5,544 Roman Catholic Christians (1.78%)

By literacy:
 77% illiterate
 71,528 (23%) literate

The Princedom had around 5,000 Albanians and a colony of 800 Romani.

1905-1909 
In 1905 there were 6,674 emigrants, mostly to the United States.

In 1906 there were 4,346 emigrants, mostly to the United States.

In 1907 it has been estimated that there were around 282,000 inhabitants in Montenegro this year.

1909 
The 1909 official census was made based on religious affiliation of population of Principality of Montenegro.

Total: 317,856 inhabitants. By religion:
 Eastern Orthodox Christians: 94.38%
 others (mostly Muslims)

1913-1914 

The Cetinje government stated in the Code of Law in 1914 that there are around 500,000 citizens of Montenegro. It was declared that the term Montenegrin people can only refer to all citizens of the Kingdom of Montenegro, since a Montenegrin ethnicity doesn't exist and Montenegrins were seen as ethnic Serbs.

See also 

Demographics of Montenegro
Montenegrins

1921 
In 1918 Montenegro entered the Kingdom of Serbs, Croats and Slovenes. In 1921 it organised a census which recorded the mother tongue and religion. A category called Serbian or Croatian was to include all respondents who termed their mother tongue as Serbian. In the counties Andrijevica, Bar, Kolasin, Niksic, Podgorica and Cetinje, which are categorized in official statistics as Montenegro, there were:

Total: 199,227 inhabitants
Serbo-Croatian: 181,989 (91.35%)
Albanian: 16,838 (8.45%)

The counties Berane and Bijelo Polje, which are today in Montenegro, were considered counties of Old Serbia:

Berane, total 23,864 inhabitants, Serbs 23,561 or (98.73%)
Bijelo Polje, total 26,147 inhabitants, Serbs 26,136 (99.96%)

1931 
The 1931 census was also taken by the Kingdom of Yugoslavia but was later processed in Communist Yugoslavia. Results within today's borders of Montenegro were:

1948 
In 1945, after the World War II, Communist Yugoslavia was formed, and Montenegro was proclaimed as one of its constituent republics. The 1948 and following censa were taken by the Republic of Montenegro.

1953 

This census witnesses the forming of the Yugoslav nation.

1961 
The 1961 census results:

In 1968 the Communist Yugoslav government introduced a new category, ethnic Muslims.

1971

1981 
The 1981 census results:

 Total: 584,310 inhabitants
 :Montenegrins: 400,488 (68.54%)
 :ethnic Muslims: 78,080 (13.36%)
 :Albanians: 37,735 (6.46%)
 :Yugoslavs: 31,243 (5.35%)
 :Serbs: 19,407 (3.32%)
 :Croats: 6,904 (1.81%)
 :Roma: 1,471 (0.25%)
 :Macedonian: 875 (0.15%)
 :Slovenes: 564 (0.1%)
 :Hungarians: 238 (0.04%)
 :Germans: 107 (0.02%)
 :Russians: 96 (0.02%)
 :Italians: 45 (0.01%)
 :Other: 816 (0.14%)
 :No response: 301 (0.05%)
 :Regional affiliation: 1,602 (0.27%)
 :Unknown: 4,338 (0.74%)

1991 
The 1991 census results:

Total: 615,035 inhabitants

Ethnic structure 
 :Montenegrins: 380,467 (61.86%)
 :ethnic Muslims: 89,614 (14.57%)
 :Serbs: 57,453 (9.34%)
 :Albanians: 40,415 (6.57%)
 :Yugoslavs: 26,159 (4.25%)
 :Croats: 6,244 (1.02%)
 :Roma: 3,282 (0.53%)
 :Macedonian: 1,072 (0.17%)
 :Slovenes: 369 (0.06%)
 :Hungarians: 205 (0.03%)
 :Germans: 124 (0.02%)
 :Russians: 118 (0.02%)
 :Italians: 58 (0.01%)
 :Other: 437 (0.07%)
 :No response: 1,944 (0.32%)
 :Regional affiliation: 998 (0.16%)
 :Unknown: 6,076 (0.99%)

Linguistic structure 
Serbian: 510,320
Montenegrin: 144,838
Albanian: 43,907  (7.15%) 
40,008 Muslims declared their language to be Serbian, while most declared either Bosniak or Bosnian languages as their mother tongue

Religious structure 
Eastern Orthodox - 425,133
Montenegrins - 241,728
Serbs - 196,333
Muslims - 118,016
Albanians - 26,216
Montenegrins - 82,492
Yugoslavs - 1,856
Catholic - 27,153
Albanians - 12,772
Yugoslavs - 4,149
Montenegrins - 3,081

2003 
The 2003 census was undertaken by authorities in Montenegro, which at this time, together with Serbia, constituted Serbia and Montenegro.

Total: 620,145

Ethnic structure 
Montenegrins 267,669 (43.16%)
Serbs 198,414 (31.99%)
Bosniaks 48,184 (7.77%)
Albanians 31,163 (5.03%)
ethnic Muslims 24,625 (3.97%)
Croats 6,811 (1.1%)
Roma 2,601 (0.42%)
Yugoslavs 1,860 (0.3%)
Macedonians 819 (0.13%)
Slovenes 415 (0.07%)
Hungarians 362 (0.06%)
Russians 240 (0.04%)
Egyptians 225 (0.04%)
Italians 127 (0.02%)
Germans 118 (0.02%)
Others (i.e. Greeks, Turks, Romanians, Bulgarians) 2,180 (0.35%)
No response 26,906 (4.34%)
Regional affiliation 1,258 (0.2%)
Unknown 6,168 (0.99%)

This census witnessed the forming of the Bosniak nation, but some people still thought of themselves ethnic Muslims, however. Also, there are very few people left who consider themselves Yugoslavs. But the biggest difference compared to the 1991 census is the dramatic increase in self-identification of many inhabitants as Serbs, which was not the case in Socialist Yugoslavia.

 Linguistic structure 
Serbian - 393.740 (63,49%)
Montenegrin: 136.208 (21,96%)
Albanian - 32.603 (5,26%)
Bosniak - 19.906 (3,21%)
Bosnian - 14.172 (2,29%)
Croatian - 2.791 (0,45%)
Roma - 2.602 (0,42%)
undeclared: 13.902 (2,24%)

 Religious structure 

 2011 

Total: 620,029

 Ethnic structure 

Montenegrins 278,865 (44.98%)
Serbs 178,110 (28.73%)
Bosniaks 53,605 (8.65%)
Albanians 30,439 (4.91%)
ethnic Muslims 20,537 (3.31%)
Roma 6,251 (1.01%)
Croats 6,021 (0.97%)
Others 46,201 (7.44%)

 Linguistic structure 

Serbian: 265,895 (42.88%)
Montenegrin: 229,251 (36.97%)
Bosnian: 33,077 (5.33%)
Albanian: 32,671 (5.27%)
Roma: 5,169 (0.83%)
Bosniak: 3,662 (0.59%)
Croatian: 2,791 (0.45%)
Others: 47,513 (7.68%)

 Religious structure 

Eastern Orthodox - 446,858 (72.07%)
Muslims - 118,477 (19.11%)
Catholic - 21,299 (3.44%)
Others 27,756 (5.38%'')

Sources 
 Montenegrin Census' from 1909 to 2003
 The Ethnic Structure of the Population in Montenegro
 "Petar I Petrovic' - DJELA" publisher CID Podgorica 1999 year, printed by "Vojna tamparija" - Beograd
 "Statistički Godišnjak 2006" - Statistical Office of Montenegro

References 

 

Geographic history of Montenegro
Religion in Montenegro
Montenegrin culture
Montenegro